Małgorzata Socha (born 23 April 1980) is a Polish actress. Mostly known from TV series BrzydUla, Na Wspólnej and Przyjaciółki.

Personal life
She was born in Warsaw, Poland. In 2003, she graduated from The Aleksander Zelwerowicz National Academy of Dramatic Art in Warsaw. On July 5, 2008, she married Krzysztof Wiśniewski. On August 11, 2014, gave birth to their daughter named Zofia. On January 20, 2017 gave birth to second daughter named Barbara. On September 4, 2018, gave birth to third child, son named Stanisław.

Filmography

References

External links
 

Polish actresses
1980 births
Living people
Polish television actresses
Polish film actresses
Aleksander Zelwerowicz National Academy of Dramatic Art in Warsaw alumni